Takifugu chrysops is a species of pufferfish in the family Tetraodontidae. It is a marine species known from Japan, where it ranges from Tosa Bay to Tokyo Bay. It is a demersal fish that reaches 20 cm (7.9 inches) SL. Although sometimes known as the red-eyed puffer, this can lead to confusion with several freshwater species of the genus Carinotetraodon.

References 

chrysops
Fish of Japan
Fish described in 1879